Air Marshal Trilochan Singh Brar PVSM AVSM  He was awarded the Param Vishisht Seva Medal and Ati Vishisht Seva Medal. He was Vice Chief of the Air Staff from 22 Sep 1981 to 31 Dec 1983.

References

Indian aviators
Indian Air Force air marshals
1925 births
2014 deaths
Recipients of the Param Vishisht Seva Medal
Recipients of the Ati Vishisht Seva Medal
Indian Air Force officers
Commandants of the Indian Air Force Academy
Vice Chiefs of Air Staff (India)